The Nallin Farm Springhouse and Bank Barn are closely associated with the Nallin Farm House on the grounds of Fort Detrick, Maryland, US. The barn is a good example of a fieldstone-built bank barn with a byre on the lower level and an earth ramp on the opposite side providing access to a haymow.

The simple stone springhouse is the source of -acre Nallin Pond. The barn and springhouse were built .

The Nallin Farm Springhouse and Bank Barn was listed on the National Register of Historic Places in 1977.

The barn has a hay hood, as can be seen in the 14th of 17 photos included in the nomination.

References

External links
, including undated photo, at Maryland Historical Trust

Buildings and structures in Frederick County, Maryland
Barns in Maryland
Fort Detrick
Barns on the National Register of Historic Places in Maryland
Agricultural buildings and structures on the National Register of Historic Places in Maryland
Agricultural buildings and structures in Maryland
National Register of Historic Places in Frederick County, Maryland
Barns with hay hoods